The Minardi M02 was the car with which the Minardi Formula One team competed in the 2000 Formula One season.

Development
The M02 was designed by Gustav Brunner. The car was a clear development from the M01 featuring new pointed nose cone, compact sides and high exhausts. The M02 developed the titanium cased gearbox from 1999 even further, which helped with weight. The M02 was the first F1 car to adopt set down brake callipers in a seasonal development.  The M02 continued using the Ford Cosworth V10 engine which was the same power unit from 1998. It was badged Fondmetal.

Drivers
For 2000, Marc Gene was retained by Minardi and began his second season with the team.  Argentinian driver Gaston Mazzacane was promoted to a race seat in a move widely recognised as a pay driver.  Fernando Alonso was the teams test driver. Ahead of the European Grand Prix at the Nurburgring, Giorgio Vinella was recruited as an additional test driver to support development of the M02.

Racing history
The M02 was launched on 16 February, 2000 at the Guggenheim Museum in Bilbao. Testing work began on the car in January with Gene and Mazzacane running new parts on the M01 chassis at Fiorano Circuit.  In February, Minardi joined tests at Barcelona and showed good pace, Gene securing a fastest lap time of the week that put him in 9th place overall, ahead of Jordan, Jaguar and Prost.  Mazzacane was consistently around 1 second slower than his team mate.

The season began well for Gene, qualifying the M02 in 18th place and finishing the race in 8th. Mazzacane qualified last and retired on lap 40 with gearbox failure.  The M02 would not finish the next two races for Gene, and Mazzacane finished four Grand Prix before breaking into the top 10 for the first time at the 2000 European Grand Prix.  By Monaco, a race in which both cars failed to finish, the M02 had chalked up six race retirements.

The remainder of the season was a myriad of retirements and disappointments for the M02, it was firmly off the pace. At Belgium, Minardi celebrated their 250th Grand Prix. A highlight of the season was at the 2000 United States Grand Prix USA Grand Prix in Indianapolis, when Mazzacane managed to find himself in third position early on in the race ahead of reigning world champion Mika Hakkinen.  He would however ultimately retire due to engine problems.

The M02 eventually finished a de facto tenth in the Constructors' Championship, with no points but ahead of Prost due to a better finishing record. The team therefore qualified for some of the sport's television revenues in 2001.

Following the conclusion of the season, Gabriele Rumi was looking to sell his 70 percent stake in the team. Sponsor PSN were announced as purchasing this in September 2000, which would have tied in with their driver Mazzacane remaining with the team. However by November they had pulled out of the deal. PSN and Mazzacane would ultimately switch to Prost Grand Prix for 2001.  Gene also left for Williams, along with key sponsor Telefonica.  Paul Stoddart purchased Minardi from Rumi, and the M02 would be the last car produced under his leadership of the team.

Livery 
For 2000, Minardi had extensive financial backing from Telefonica, which became the title sponsors for the season. The cars were painted in a bold fluorescent yellow finish to reference the partnership.

Complete Formula One results
(key) (results in bold indicate pole position) 

* Denotes Cosworth-built engines, badged as Fondmetal

References

Minardi Formula One cars
2000 Formula One season cars